Franz I (Franz de Paula Maria Karl August; 28 August 1853 – 25 July 1938) was Prince of Liechtenstein from 11 February 1929 until his death in 1938.

Early life

Franz de Paula Maria Karl August was born on 28 August 1853, to Aloys II and Franziska Kinsky in Liechtenstein Castle. He attended the University of Vienna and the University of Prague before serving as the successor to Count Anton Graf von Wolkenstein-Trostburg as the Austro-Hungarian ambassador to the Russian Empire from 1894 to 1898. He was the 1,204th Knight of the Order of the Golden Fleece in Austria.

He fell in love with Elisabeth von Gutmann, a widow who had converted to Roman Catholicism from Judaism in 1899, but his brother Johann disapproved of the relationship and refused to consent to it. In 1919, he secretly married Gutmann in Salzberg and remarried her following Johann's death on 22 July 1929.

Reign

On 11 February 1929, Johann II died, passing the title of Prince of Liechtenstein to Franz. A few weeks after he took the title, 395,360 acres of land belonging to the Liechtenstein family was seized by Czechoslovakia. A delegation of farmers petitioned him to establish a republic in Liechtenstein, but ended their attempts when he stated that he would not give any of his money towards the country, forcing it to rely solely on taxation.

In 1937, Prime Minister Josef Hoop admitted that Austrian pretender Otto von Habsburg was living in Liechtenstein Castle as a guest of Franz I in order to be closer to Austria rather than in his previous residence of Steenokkerzeel, Belgium. An extradition treaty was also signed between Liechtenstein and the United States.

He had no children so his nephew Prince Aloys was next in line, but Aloys removed himself from the line of succession in favor of his son, Franz Joseph, in 1923.

On 31 March 1938, he made his grandnephew Franz Joseph his regent following the Anschluss of Austria. After making his grandnephew regent he moved to Feldberg, Czechoslovakia and on 25 July, he died while at one of his family's castles, Castle Feldberg, and Franz Joseph formally succeeded him as the Prince of Liechtenstein.

Although Franz stated that he had given the regency to Franz Joseph due to his old age it was speculated that he did not wish to remain in control of the principality if Nazi Germany were to invade.

Honours
 : Founder of the Order of Merit of the Principality of Liechtenstein, 1937 – on the anniversary of his marriage.
 :
 Grand Cross of the Imperial Order of Leopold, 1897
 Knight of the Golden Fleece, 1917
 : Bailiff Grand Cross of Honour and Devotion
 :
 Knight of St. Alexander Nevsky
 Knight of St. Andrew, 1906
 : Knight of St. Hubert, 1909

References

External links 
 Princely House of Liechtenstein
 

1853 births
1938 deaths
19th-century Roman Catholics
20th-century Roman Catholics
Ambassadors of Austria-Hungary to Russia
Austro-Hungarian diplomats
Charles University alumni
Liechtenstein Roman Catholics
Princes of Liechtenstein
University of Vienna alumni
Knights of the Golden Fleece of Austria
Knights of Malta